The 2010 Critérium du Dauphiné was the 62nd edition of the Critérium du Dauphiné (formerly Critérium du Dauphiné Libéré) stage race, and the first since it was renamed. It took place from 6–13 June, and was part of both the 2010 UCI ProTour and World Calendar. It began in Evian-les-Bains with an individual time trial, and ended in Sallanches.

Contador won the points classification on a tie-break with Brajkovič, 's Egoi Martínez won the mountains classification and Euskaltel-Euskadi also won the teams classification.

Teams
As the Dauphiné Libéré was a UCI ProTour event, the 18 ProTour teams are invited automatically, plus an additional 4 non pro tour teams. They were:

Pre-race favourites
The winner of the event for the previous two years, Alejandro Valverde, had been widely tipped to do well in the event,  but was banned from all of UCI registered races for 19 months from a few days prior to the event. Two time Tour de France winner Alberto Contador started the race as favourite, but emphasized that his priority was to use the race as preparation for the Tour de France, without particular concern to win it.

Route

Stages

Prologue
6 June 2010 – Evian-les-Bains,  (Individual time trial)

Stage and General Classification after Prologue

Stage 1
7 June 2010 – Evian-les-Bains to Saint-Laurent-du-Pont,

Stage 2
8 June 2010 – Annonay to Bourg-Saint-Andéol,

Stage 3
9 June 2010 – Monteux to Sorgues,  (individual time trial)

Stage 4
10 June 2010 – Saint-Paul-Trois-Châteaux to Risoul,

Stage 5
11 June 2010 – Serre-Chevalier to Grenoble,

Stage 6
12 June 2010 – Crolles to Alpe d'Huez,

Stage 7
13 June 2010 – Allevard to Sallanches,

Classification leadership

Final standings

General Classification

Teams Classification

Mountains Classification

Points Classification

References

Further reading

External links
 

2010 in French sport
2010 UCI ProTour
2010
2010 UCI World Ranking
June 2010 sports events in Europe